Events from the year 1760 in Ireland.

Incumbent
Monarch: George II (until 25 October), then George III

Events
21–26 February – Battle of Carrickfergus: A force of French troops under the command of privateer François Thurot captures and holds the town and castle of Carrickfergus before retiring; the force is defeated (and Thurot killed) in a naval action in the Irish Sea on 28 February.
25 October – George III becomes King of Great Britain and Ireland upon the death of George II.
A Patriot Party under the leadership of Henry Flood, appears in the Irish House of Representatives.

Births
28 January – Mathew Carey, publisher and economist in the United States (d. 1839).
14 June – George Forbes, 6th Earl of Granard, general (d. 1837).
20 September – John Keating, soldier and land developer (d. 1853).
Jerome Alley, clergyman and writer (d. 1826).
Thomas Barnes Gough, merchant and politician in Upper Canada (d. 1815).
Francis Johnston, architect (d. 1829).
James Cavanah Murphy, architect and antiquary (d. 1814).
Edmond Stanley, lawyer and politician (d. 1843).
Approximate date – Oliver Bond, merchant and revolutionary (d. 1798).

Deaths
26 March – Margaret Woffington, actress (b. c1720).
23 September – Sir Thomas Prendergast, 2nd Baronet, politician.
25 October – George II, King of Great Britain and Ireland; Elector of Hanover; Duke of Brunswick-Lüneburg  (born 1683)
Full date unknown
Patrick Cotter O'Brien, known as the Bristol Giant and the Irish Giant (died 1806).

References

 
Years of the 18th century in Ireland
Ireland
1760s in Ireland